Prema Baraha, titled Sollividava in Tamil, is a 2018 Indian romantic drama film written and directed by Arjun Sarja. It was produced by his wife Niveditha Arjun under his home studio of Sree Raam Films International, and made simultaneously in Kannada and Tamil languages. The film stars Chandan Kumar and Aishwarya Arjun, with different ensemble casts for the two versions. Jassie Gift composed the soundtrack and score. H. C. Venugopal was director of photography and Kay Kay edited the film. The two versions of the film were released worldwide on 9 February 2018. During its release, this film had a grand opening and it became a commercial success at the box office of Karnataka, but had a decent run in Tamil.

Plot 
Sanjay (Chandan Kumar) and Madhu (Aishwarya Arjun) are two journalists from rival news organizations who do not have the best equation. However, when the two of them are forced to work together when they are covering the Kargil War, there is a bond that is forged between the two.

Cast 

 Kannada version

 Darshan in a special appearance in "Jai Hanumantha"
 Chiranjeevi Sarja in a special appearance in "Jai Hanumantha"
 Dhruva Sarja in a special appearance in "Jai Hanumantha"
 Amandeep Chawla in a special appearance in "Jai Hanumantha"
Tamil version
 Yogi Babu as Yogi
 Nellai Siva as Traffic police officer

Production 
In December 2015, Arjun announced that he was set to produce and direct a bilingual Kannada and Tamil romantic film featuring his daughter Aishwarya Arjun in the lead role. He had initially narrated three stories to his daughter, who was most satisfied with a script on two journalists falling in love during the Kargil War of 1999. While he was working on the screenplay, Arjun spent a week in the studios of Asian News International and went through all the material they had on Kargil. Kannada actor Chetan Kumar was signed on to feature as the lead actor in the project, thus making his debut in Tamil films. In May 2016, Chetan Kumar backed out of the project, unhappy with his characterisation in the film, and was replaced by another Kannada actor Chandan Kumar. For her particular role, Aishwarya Arjun carefully observed the style and characteristics of Barkha Dutt, who worked as a journalist during the 1999 conflict.

The film was launched in May 2016, with promotional stills from a shoot released shortly after. The film's first schedule was completed in July 2016, with Suhasini and K. Viswanath also joining the film's cast. The film was then shot in Dharamsala, Chennai, Hyderabad, Kerala, Mumbai, Switzerland, and Italy. In August 2017, the Tamil title was changed from Kadhalin Ponveedhiyil to Sollividava. The Kannada title of Prema Baraha is derived from Arjun Sarja's song Prema Baraha Koti Taraha from the film Prathap (1990).

Soundtrack 

Jassie Gift has composed the score and songs for the film, with Divo releasing the soundtrack in Kannada and U1 Records in Tamil. The heroine introduction theme included in the album was composed by Aruldev. The title track is based on the song "Prema Baraha" from the Kannada film Prathap (1990).
Kannada version

Tamil version

Critical reception

Kannada version
A critic from The Times of India wrote that "Watch this film if you're a fan of the stereotypical commercial fare, replete with comedy, sentiments, action and romance". A critic from Deccan Chronicle opined that "Unfortunately, the brilliant actor Arjun Sarja falls short in deploying the right force and making use of the right kind of ammunition for this kind of lovely mission".

Tamil version
A critic from The Hindu said that "What lets the film down is Arjun's unfocussed writing, un-missable lectures on nationalism and using stock Kargil war footage liberally instead of staging the war". A critic from The New Indian Express stated that "On the whole, it's just a run-of-the-mill romantic film which has almost no redeeming factors".

References

External links 
 
 

2010s Tamil-language films
Films directed by Arjun Sarja
2018 films
Indian multilingual films
Indian romantic drama films
2018 romantic drama films
2010s Kannada-language films
Films scored by Jassie Gift
Films shot in Chennai
Films about terrorism in India
Films shot in Mumbai
Films shot in Switzerland
Films shot in Kerala
Films shot in Hyderabad, India
Films shot at Ramoji Film City
Kashmir conflict in films
2018 multilingual films